Kuhe may refer to:

 Wilhelm Kuhe (1823–1912), a German pianist and piano teacher
 Kuhe, Bhiwandi, a village in Bhiwandi taluka, Thane, Maharashtra, India

See also 
 Kuha (disambiguation)